Victor Ronald Salva (born March 29, 1958) is an American filmmaker. He has primarily worked in the horror genre, most notably as the writer-director of the commercially successful Jeepers Creepers (2001) and its sequels Jeepers Creepers 2 (2003) and Jeepers Creepers 3 (2017). Outside of horror, Salva wrote and directed the fantasy-drama film Powder (1995).

Salva's filmmaking career has been controversial due to his 1988 conviction for sexually abusing a 12-year-old actor who starred in his feature film debut Clownhouse (1989), along with possessing child pornography. This controversy has led to protests against his films, including a boycott of Powder organized by his victim.

Early life
Born in Martinez, California, Salva was raised as a Roman Catholic. His biological father abandoned the family and Salva stated that his stepfather was an alcoholic and physically abusive.

The adolescent Salva was very interested in horror and sci-fi; his favorite monster movie was Creature from the Black Lagoon and, in 1975, the local newspaper reported that Salva had sat through Jaws 55 times. By the time he graduated from high school, Salva had written and directed more than 20 short and feature films. To finance his filmmaking hobby, he often held two jobs during the week. Salva's family disowned him at 18 when he came out as gay to his mother and stepfather.

Early career
In the mid-1980s, his 37-minute short film Something in the Basement (1986) took first place in the fiction category at the Sony/AFI Home Video Competition. A horror allegory about a young boy awaiting his brother's return from a bloody war, the highly acclaimed film went on to win several national awards (including a Bronze Plaque at the Chicago International Film Festival) and brought Salva to the attention of Francis Ford Coppola, who then produced Salva's first theatrical feature, Clownhouse (1989), which Salva again wrote and directed.

Child sexual abuse and child pornography
In 1988, Salva was convicted of sexual misconduct with one of Clownhouses underage stars, who was 12 years old at the time, and videotaping one of the encounters. Commercial videotapes and magazines containing child pornography were also found in his home. Salva pleaded guilty to lewd and lascivious conduct, oral sex with a person under fourteen, and procuring a child for pornography. He was sentenced to three years in state prison, of which he served 15 months. He completed his parole in 1992.

Later career
Salva's career took a hiatus after his release – he did not make another film for five years. He worked as a telemarketer during the week and wrote scripts during the weekend, supposedly delivering them to well-known producers while posing as a delivery boy.

His next film was The Nature of the Beast (1995), a direct-to-video mystery horror film which Salva wrote and directed. It starred Lance Henriksen and Eric Roberts. Salva based the film's characters on people he met in prison.

Salva next made his first big-studio picture, Powder (1995), the tale of an albino boy with special powers that make him an outcast. At the time of the film's release, Salva's conviction became known to the public when his victim came forward, calling for the film's boycott. Disney officials stated that they had been informed of Salva's crime only after production of Powder had begun.

Salva next made Rites of Passage (1999), a coming-of-age thriller. The film depicts a homophobic father who unwittingly pushes his gay son into the arms of a psychotic killer.

In 2001, Salva wrote and directed Jeepers Creepers, which was a breakout hit and set a record for the largest Labor Day box-office ever. Salva followed this up with his sixth feature film, Jeepers Creepers 2 (2003), breaking his old record and setting another Labor Day milestone. Principal photography began in February 2017 for another sequel, Jeepers Creepers 3, which was released in September of that year.

His next film after Jeepers Creepers 2 was Peaceful Warrior (2006), an adaptation of the semi-autobiographical book Way of the Peaceful Warrior by Dan Millman. The film depicts the emotional and physical trials of a young gymnast and his awakening under the tutelage of a mysterious spiritual guide portrayed by Nick Nolte.

He then returned to the horror-thriller and supernatural powers themes for his films Rosewood Lane (2011) and Dark House (2014).

Salva described his films in 2001 as "atmospheric and macabre, with no happy endings, but not to be taken totally seriously".

Filmography

 1986: Something in the Basement
 1989: Clownhouse
 1995: The Nature of the Beast
 1995: Powder
 1999: Rites of Passage
 2001: Jeepers Creepers
 2003: Jeepers Creepers 2
 2006: Peaceful Warrior
 2011: Rosewood Lane
 2014: Dark House
 2017: Jeepers Creepers 3

References

External links

1958 births
Living people
American people convicted of child pornography offenses
American people convicted of child sexual abuse
American male screenwriters
Hispanic and Latino American film directors
Horror film directors
Writers from Los Angeles
People from Martinez, California
Prisoners and detainees of California
Criminals from Los Angeles
Gay entertainers
LGBT people from California
American LGBT entertainers
LGBT Roman Catholics
American LGBT screenwriters
Film directors from Los Angeles
Catholics from California
Screenwriters from California
People from Palmdale, California
LGBT film directors